João of Braganza, born ca. 1430, was the second son of Fernando I, Duke of Braganza and of his wife, the duchess Joan of Castro.

Life
Through a letter issued on 30 October 1471, king Afonso V of Portugal granted him the Lordship of Montemor-o-Novo and on 25 April 1473, he was appointed the 7th Constable of Portugal, as was his great-grandfather, Nuno Álvares Pereira. Later, in 1478, the same king granted him the title of Marquis of Montemor-o-Novo – he was the first and sole marquis of this title.

Before 25 July 1460, he married his 3rd cousin, Isabel of Noronha (niece of Christopher Columbus), a natural daughter of the Archbishop of Lisbon Pedro de Noronha (who was himself, a grandson of king Fernando I of Portugal and grandson of king Henry II of Castile through an illegitimate line).

When king John II of Portugal succeeded to the Portuguese throne and started actively his policy against the high nobility power (namely the Braganza and the Viseu families) João was soon one the king's targets. He escaped to Castile but in Portugal he was condemned for treason, and his statue was symbolically executed in Abrantes, on 12 September 1483.

He died in Seville, on 30 April 1484, where he was buried, together with his wife, in the Santa Paula Monastery.

Ancestry

See also
List of Marquesses in Portugal
House of Braganza

Bibliography
"Nobreza de Portugal e Brasil" - Vol. II, pages 29 and 30. Published by Zairol Lda., Lisbon 1989;
"O Marquês de Montemor e a sua vida pública" de Anastásia Mestrinho Salgado, Edições Cosmos, Lisbon 1997.

House of Braganza
Marquesses
1430 births
15th-century Portuguese people
1484 deaths
Constables of Portugal
Portuguese nobility